Dato' Wira Othman bin Abdul (born 7 July 1963) is a Malaysian corporate and political figure. He was the Member of the Parliament of Malaysia for the constituency of Pendang, Kedah. He held the seat for three times; from 1986 to 1999, from 2002 to 2004, and again from 2013 to 2018. He is a member of the United Malays National Organisation (UMNO) in Malaysia's previous governing Barisan Nasional (BN) coalition.

Othman was appointed as an Independent non-executive director for the KSK Group Berhad (previously known as Kurnia Asia Bhd) on 13 April 2004. He is also the Chairman of the Nominating and Remuneration Committee and he is also appointed as one of the members of the Audit Committee.

Education
Othman Abdul was a former student from the National University of Malaysia. He studied science, majoring in sociology. After graduating in 1978, he worked as an officer in the Family Planning Board and the Kedah State Development Corporation. From 1980 to 1983, he was the Assistant District Officer of Pendang.

Political career
Othman was elected to Parliament in the 1986 election, for the seat of Pendang, Kedah, defeating Phahrolrazi Zawawi of the Pan-Malaysian Islamic Party (PAS) by 900 votes. He held the seat for three terms, before losing it at the 1999 election to PAS's leader Fadzil Noor. At the time of the 1999 election Othman was serving as a parliamentary secretary to Prime Minister Mahathir Mohamad.

When Fadzil Noor died in 2002, Othman stood as the Barisan Nasional candidate in the high-profile and closely fought by-election that followed. He won his seat back, defeating PAS's Mohd Hayati Othman by 283 votes. However, he was replaced as the Barisan Nasional candidate for the 2004 general election, and the coalition lost the seat to PAS.

Othman returned as the Barisan Nasional candidate for Pendang at the 2013 election. PAS had held the seat since 2004, but had decided to replace its incumbent member with the party's high-profile deputy president, Mohamad Sabu. Amid a swing to the Barisan Nasional across the state of Kedah, Othman won the seat by 2,638 votes, returning to Parliament for his third non-consecutive period in office.

Othman failed to retain the Pendang seat in a 4-corners fight in the 2018 election losing to the PAS candidate.

Koperasi Islah Malaysia Berhad
Othman was also the KIMB (Koperasi Islah Malaysia Berhad) Chairman for four consecutive years. He also acted as the institution Audit Committee for KIMB up to June 2008. He is now replaced with Dr Haji Ahmad Zainuddin Bin Abdullah.

Election results

Honours
  :
  Knight Companion of the Order of Sultan Salahuddin Abdul Aziz Shah (DSSA) – Dato' (1996)
  :
  Knight Commander of the Glorious Order of the Crown of Kedah (DGMK) – Dato' Wira (2007)

See also

Pendang (federal constituency)

References

Living people
1963 births
Malaysian people of Malay descent
Malaysian Muslims
United Malays National Organisation politicians
Members of the Dewan Rakyat
21st-century Malaysian politicians